The Sulawesi pied crow or Vanoort's crow (Euploea eupator) is a species of nymphalid butterfly in the Danainae subfamily. It is endemic to Sulawesi, Indonesia.

References

Euploea
Butterflies of Indonesia
Endemic fauna of Indonesia
Fauna of Sulawesi
Taxonomy articles created by Polbot